Köselitz is a former village and municipality in the district of Wittenberg, Saxony-Anhalt, Germany.

Köselitz may also refer to:

former name of Kozielice, Pyrzyce County, Poland
a subdivision of the Röderaue municipality, Germany
Heinrich Köselitz,  German author and composer